Cyril Aloysius Weidenborner (March 30, 1895 – November 26, 1983) was an American ice hockey player. He played as a goaltender on the United States hockey teams. The team competed in the 1920 Summer Olympics, winning the silver medal.

References

External links
 

1895 births
1983 deaths
American men's ice hockey goaltenders
Ice hockey players at the 1920 Summer Olympics
Ice hockey players from Minnesota
Medalists at the 1920 Summer Olympics
Olympic silver medalists for the United States in ice hockey
St. Paul Athletic Club ice hockey players